Australocheles is a genus of mites in the family Leptolaelapidae, first described by Wolfgang Karg in 1983. There is at least one described species in Australocheles, A. holmi.

References

Mesostigmata
Articles created by Qbugbot
Taxa named by Wolfgang Karg
Animals described in 1983